British Salmson aero-engines refers to a series of small French designed, air-cooled radial aero engine that were produced by British Salmson Aero Engines Ltd, under license from Société des Moteurs Salmson, in Great Britain during the late 1920s and 1930s.

Because the relatively low power was divided among several cylinders, the running of the engines was particularly smooth, and the torque was very even. Adding to the smooth running of these engines was the use of the Canton-Unne system of planetary gears in a cage connecting pistons to crank-pin.

Variants
AD.3Three cylinder license production of the Salmson 3 Ad
AC.7 seven cylinder radial, capacity 
AC.9 nine cylinder radial, capacity 
Bore of 70 mm.
AD.9R, geared version of AD.9 with increased bore of 73 mm and increased compression ratio (6:1) (3239cc / 197.7cuin).
AD.9NG, increased bore and stroke. (100 x 140 mm, 9896cc (603.9cuin) capacity).

Applications
AD.9
Angus Aquila
BA Swallow
Comper Swift
Boulton Paul P.41 Phoenix
General Aircraft Monospar
Hafner Revoplane
Hinkler Ibis
Parmentier Wee Mite
AD.9R
Arpin A-1
AD.9NG
Cierva C.40

Specifications (AD.9)

See also

References

Notes

Bibliography

 Flight magazine, 25 July 1929.
 Flight magazine, 22 November 1929.
Flight magazine, April 4, 1930.

1920s aircraft piston engines
Aircraft air-cooled radial piston engines
Salmson aircraft engines